The preliminary round of the 2019 Africa Cup of Nations qualification tournament decided three teams which advanced to the group stage of the qualification tournament. The preliminary round consisted of the six lowest-ranked teams among the 51 entrants: Madagascar, São Tomé and Príncipe, South Sudan, Comoros, Djibouti, and Mauritius.

The six teams were drawn into three ties, played in home-and-away two-legged format between 22 and 28 March 2017.

The three winners advanced to the group stage to join the 45 teams which entered directly.

Matches
If the aggregate score was tied after the second leg, the away goals rule was applied, and if still tied, extra time was not played, and a penalty shoot-out was used to determine the winner (Regulations Article 15).

|}

Madagascar won 4–2 on aggregate and advanced to qualification Group A.

Comoros won 3–1 on aggregate and advanced to qualification Group B.

South Sudan won 6–2 on aggregate and advanced to qualification Group C.

Goalscorers
There were 18 goals scored in 6 matches, for an average of  goals per match.

2 goals

 Paulin Voavy
 James Moga

1 goal

 Chaker Alhadhur
 Ben Nabouhane
 Benjaloud Youssouf
 Mohamed Salem Breik
 Abdi Idleh Hamza
 Carolus Andriamatsinoro
 Kévin Bru
 Harramiz
 Zé
 Leon Uso Khamis
 Dominic Abui Pretino
 Athir Thomas
 Duku Wurube

1 own goal

 Jordão Diogo

References

External links
32nd Edition Of Total Africa Cup Of Nations, CAFonline.com

Preliminary round